is a retired Japanese women's professional shogi player ranked 6-dan. She is the first female to be accepted into the Japan Shogi Association's apprentice school and is a former Women's Meijin and  title holder.  She also holds the records for being the oldest women's professional to win an official game at 71 years and 9 months.

Promotion history
Takojima's promotion history is as follows.

Apprentice professional
1961: 7-kyū
1966: 1-dan

Women's professional
1967: 2-dan
1974, October 31: 3-dan
1976, November 26: 4-dan
1988, November 17: 5-dan
2017, May 21: 6-dan

Note: The above are women's professional ranks.

Major titles
Takojima appeared in major title matches a total of eleven times and won a total of seven titles. She won the Women's Meijin title four times (197476, 1981) and the  title three times (1978-1980).

Awards and honors
Takojima won the Japan Shogi Association's "Women's Professional" Annual Shogi Award in 1980 and 1981.

References

External links
 公益社団法人日本女子プロ将棋協会 

Japanese shogi players
Living people
Retired women's professional shogi players
LPSA
Professional shogi players from Tokyo
People from Suginami
Women's Meijin
Women's Ōshō
1946 births